Pichidegua is a Chilean commune and town in Cachapoal Province, O'Higgins Region.

Demographics
Of these, 4,965 (28%) lived in urban areas and 12,791 (72%) in rural areas. The population grew by 7% (1,162 persons) between the 1992 and 2002 censuses.

Administration
As a commune, Pichidegua is a third-level administrative division of Chile administered by a municipal council, headed by an alcalde who is directly elected every four years.

Within the electoral divisions of Chile, Pichidegua is represented in the Chamber of Deputies by Alejandra Sepúlveda (PRI) and Javier Macaya (UDI) as part of the 34th electoral district, together with San Fernando, Chimbarongo, San Vicente, Peumo and Las Cabras. The commune is represented in the Senate by Andrés Chadwick Piñera (UDI) and Juan Pablo Letelier Morel (PS) as part of the 9th senatorial constituency (O'Higgins Region).

References

External links
   Municipality of Pichidegua

Communes of Chile
Populated places in Cachapoal Province